RCAF Station Estevan was a World War II, British Commonwealth Air Training Plan (BCATP) base operated by the Royal Canadian Air Force (RCAF). It was located South of the City of Estevan, Saskatchewan, Canada.

World War II (1942-4)
On 27 April 1942, the airfield became home to the Royal Air Force's, No. 38 Service Flying Training School(SFTS).  Although the school was run by the Royal Air Force it and others were considered extensions of the British Commonwealth Training Plan until they were officially incorporated into the BCATP in 1942. 38 SFTS flew Avro Anson twin-engine trainers until 11 Feb 1944, when 38 SFTS was disbanded.

Aerodrome Information 
Five runways were listed as follows:

A review of Google Maps on 8 June 2018 shows the area that was once home to this facility is now an open pit mine.  There is no visible evidence that the facility ever existed.

Relief landing field – Outram
The Relief field was constructed in the typical triangular pattern. 
Three runways were listed as follows:

A review of Google Maps on 5 June 2018 shows A triangular pattern consistent with a now cultivated BCATP Aerodrome.  But the coordinates stated above appear to be slightly off.  Corrected coordinates are

Relief landing field – Chandler
The site was located east of the railway siding of Chandler, Saskatchewan. The Relief field was listed as Turf with a triangular runway layout. 
The Aerodrome was listed as an All way field with three runways, they were listed as follows

A review of Google Maps on 8 June 2018 shows no visibility of an airfield at the posted coordinates. But nearby there appears to be the impression of a runway, this other site appears consisitant with the c.1942 map.  The possible coordinates are

Post War
On 15 September 1946, 21 personnel of the Royal Canadian Air Force were killed at the airport when the C-47 Dakota transport carrying them back to Canada from Fargo, North crashed on the airport. The pilots had been transferring Cornell Aircraft back to the United States on the completion of the Lend Lease Agreement in place during the Second World War.  The airmen were on the strength of No. 124 (Communications) Squadron, Rockcliffe, Ontario.

At some point after the war the decommissioned Station was demolished and an open pit coal mine has removed all traces of the former station.

Between the end of the war and the demolition of this facility the aerodrome was used as the Estevan Airport.

Present Day
There is no trace of the former station today.

References

External links
 Bruce Forsyth's Military History Page

Military airbases in Saskatchewan
Canadian Forces bases in Canada (closed)
Airports of the British Commonwealth Air Training Plan
Defunct airports in Saskatchewan
Military history of Saskatchewan
Royal Canadian Air Force stations